Peter George Martell (April 23, 1959 – July 31, 2016) was a Canadian football player who played for the Winnipeg Blue Bombers and Montreal Concordes of the Canadian Football League (CFL). Prior to his CFL career, he played at St. Francis Xavier University. He died of Huntington's disease in 2016.

References

1959 births
2016 deaths
Deaths from Huntington's disease
Montreal Concordes players
Players of Canadian football from Nova Scotia
St. Francis Xavier X-Men football players
Winnipeg Blue Bombers players